Teijo Eloranta (born 3 January 1960) is a Finnish actor, television writer and blues musician. His stage name is Maisteri T.

Born in Hämeenlinna, Finland, Eloranta began his career in 1991 in television appearing chiefly on TV between then and 2003. However, since 2003 he has increasingly moved into film. In the 2006 film Saippuaprinssi he worked with actors such as Mikko Leppilampi and Pamela Tola.

Personal life
Eloranta was married to actress Mari Rantasila.

Partial filmography

Film
 Saippuaprinssi (2006)
 Ricky Rapper and the Bicycle Thief (Risto Räppääjä ja polkupyörävaras, 2010)
 Princess (Prinsessa, 2010)

Television
 Kotikatu (1995, 2002, 2007–2008)
 Enkeleitä ja pikkupiruja (1998)
 Salatut elämät (2001) – Esko Heikkilä
 Bordertown (Sorjonen, 2019)

Discography
 Turpa kiinni ja tanssi (2012)
 Voodoo-mies (2015)

References

External links
 

1960 births
Living people
Writers from Helsinki
20th-century Finnish male actors
Finnish male television actors
Finnish screenwriters
Finnish male film actors
Male actors from Helsinki
People from Hämeenlinna
21st-century Finnish male actors
21st-century Finnish male musicians
Finnish blues musicians